The 2014–15 Stephen F. Austin Lumberjacks basketball team represented Stephen F. Austin University during the 2014–15 NCAA Division I men's basketball season. The Lumberjacks were led by head coach Brad Underwood and played their home games at the William R. Johnson Coliseum. They were members of the Southland Conference.

The Lumberjacks were picked to finish first (1st) in both the Southland Conference Coaches' Poll and in the Sports Information Directors Poll receiving eleven (11) first place votes in the Coaches' poll and ten (10) first place votes in the SID poll.

They finished the season 29–5, 17–1 in Southland play to win the Southland regular season championship. They defeated Northwestern State and Sam Houston State to become champions of the Southland tournament. They received an automatic bid to the NCAA tournament where they lost in the second round to Utah.

On May 20, 2020, following the discovery of an administrative error in certifying eligibility for student-athletes, Stephen F. Austin reached an agreement with the NCAA to vacate hundreds of wins across multiple sports from 2013 to 2019, including all 117 men's basketball wins from the 2014–15 to 2018–19 seasons.

Roster
ֶ

Schedule
Source:
Access date: 09/25/2014

|-
!colspan=9 style="background:#330066; color:#FFFFFF;"| Out of Conference

|-
!colspan=9 style="background:#330066; color:#FFFFFF;"| Conference Games

|-
!colspan=9 style="background:#330066; color:#FFFFFF;"| Southland tournament

|-
!colspan=9 style="background:#330066; color:#FFFFFF;"| NCAA tournament

See also
2014–15 Stephen F. Austin Ladyjacks basketball team
List of vacated and forfeited games in college basketball

References

Stephen F. Austin Lumberjacks basketball seasons
Stephen F. Austin
Stephen F. Austin Lumberjacks basketball
Stephen F. Austin Lumberjacks basketball
Stephen F. Austin